Philippe Gumplowicz (born 6 October 1950 in Paris) is a French professor of universities, musicologist and music historian.

Biography 
His parents, a couple of Polish Jews, emigrated to France in 1933. As a young man, Gumplowicz bathed in the "Zionist and Marxist" youth movements. He studied history and passed his master's degree at the Sorbonne University in 1972. Passionate about music, he financed his studies by playing in a jazz orchestra. He then studied social science and became passionate about psychoanalysis which he abandoned in the 1970s. He then worked on the history of musical institutions, such as the Conservatoire de Paris and the Théâtre national de l'Opéra-Comique. He defended his thesis in the mid-1980s on s in France, these amateur musical societies which in the 19th century appeared in the villages and towns of Europe. Gumplowicz teaches at the Conservatoire de Paris, the École des hautes études en sciences sociales and the University of Évry Val d'Essonne where he is the director of RASM (Recherches Arts Spectacles Musiques).

He produced for France Musique and France Culture programs and documentaries (Les Grands entretiens with pianist Jean-Claude Pennetier in 2010, Israeli historian Zeev Sternhell in April 2011 or singer Michel Delpech in October 2012) as well as documentaries such as Les années Barclay Une histoire de Haute fidélité in June 2012.

Publications 
 1991 – Le Roman du jazz. Première époque, 1893–1930, Fayard
 1988 – Les Travaux d'Orphée, on Persée,  (Book from his thesis, reissued in 2001)
 2000 – Le Roman du jazz. Deuxième époque, 1930–1942, Fayard
 2008 – Le Roman du jazz. Les modernes, Fayard
 2012 – Les Résonances de l'ombre, musique et identités de Wagner au jazz, Fayard

References

External links 
 Philippe Gumplowicz on France Culture
 Philippe Gumplowicz on France Inter
 Pour une histoire indisciplinée, Philippe Gumplowicz at PUF
 Philippe Gumplowicz on Citizen Jazz

20th-century French musicologists
21st-century French musicologists
Conservatoire de Paris alumni
Academic staff of the Conservatoire de Paris
Academic staff of the School for Advanced Studies in the Social Sciences
1950 births
Writers from Paris
Living people
French Jews